{{Infobox video game
| title = Atari Vault
| collapsible = 
| state = 
| image = File:Atari vault logo.png
| caption = 
| developer = Code Mystics
| publisher = Atari
| series = 
| engine = Unity
| platforms = Microsoft Windows, OS X, Linux
| released = Microsoft WindowsLinuxmacOS| genre = 
| modes = 
| alt = 
}}Atari Vault' is a collection of one hundred video games that Atari had produced for arcade cabinets and its Atari 2600 home console system, dating from the 1970s, 1980s, and 1990s. The collection was developed by Code Mystics, who had helmed similar collections of Atari games to other platforms, to work on Microsoft Windows, macOS, and Linux via the Steam client. The games, where possible, have been updated to include modern-day features such as local and online multiplayer and online leaderboards.

Games and updates
The games included in the collection include Asteroids, Centipede, Missile Command, Tempest, and Warlords. The collection includes a mix of arcade and Atari 2600 titles, including several titles released in both formats. The list of games also includes a number of titles that had been in development for the Atari 2600 but never were formally released as Atari 2600 but were found and distributed later in other Atari game collections such as the Atari Flashback.

The full list of games included is:

Code Mystics handled the port, previously having developed the Atari Greatest Hits series for the Nintendo DS, a similar collection of games updated for a modern system. For Atari Vault, they have worked to ensure that the games in this title would be considered the definitive modern versions, according to developer Matthew Labunka. They spent time to obtain fine details on the look and presentation, such as getting digital imagery of the arcade cabinet art to present alongside the game screen. The updated versions will be running the original games' ROM image, wrapped into an emulator made in the Unity 5 game engine. In addition to original settings that were normally available to arcade players, the player can access options that were limited to the arcade cabinet operator, such as difficulty and length of a single play session. Art and related materials are also available for each game for the player to review.

Where possible, the games have been updated to include both local and online multiplayer, and games use Steam-based score leaderboards. The games have been tuned to use the Steam controller, enabling precise controls for the games, particularly for games that used trackball input devices, like Centipede''. Code Mystics worked with Valve to fine-tune controller profiles for various games before release.

Notes

References

2016 video games
Atari arcade games
Atari video game compilations
Code Mystics games
Linux games
MacOS games
Video games developed in Canada
Windows games